The Publications Office of the European Union is the official provider of publishing services to all EU institutions, bodies and agencies. This makes it the central point of access to EU law, publications, open data, research results, procurement notices, and other official information.

Its mission is to support EU policies and make a broad range of information publicly available as accessible and reusable data. The overall aim is to facilitate transparency, economic activity, and the dissemination of knowledge.

As such, it is the central provider of access to publications of the European Union including legal publications (prominently the Official Journal of the European Union), public procurement notices, open data and applications.

Functions 

 Supports the policies and communication activities of the EU institutions and agencies with its services and offers them expertise and synergies in a number of domains.
 Ensures, with its modelling and referencing activities, that the diverse information assets coming from EU institutions take the form of findable, accessible, interoperable and reusable (FAIR) information and data.
 Makes sure that this vast array of official EU information and data – an essential element in today’s data-driven economy – is made available to the public to support transparency, economic activity, the development of modern technologies, such as artificial intelligence, and access to knowledge in general.
 Makes sure that this content is preserved and made accessible for future generations.
 Engages with citizens on a regular and increasing basis to help achieve its objectives.

Main audience 
The Publications Office’s main audience is the public (individuals and businesses). 

Thanks to its work, a wide range of official EU information is available to the public as findable, accessible, interoperable and reusable (FAIR) data — essential in today’s data-driven economy. The Publications Office thus supports transparency, economic activity, the development of modern technologies such as artificial intelligence, and access to knowledge in general.

This means it plays a significant role in several of the EU’s political priorities: democracy, the economy, and digital transformation.

Collections and services 
Community Research and Development Information Service (CORDIS), the European Commission's primary source of results from the projects funded by the EU's framework programmes for research and innovation.
EUR-Lex, the gateway to EU law, providing free access to, and information about, public legal documents from the European Union.
Ted (Tenders Electronic Daily), the online version of the Supplement to the Official Journal of the European Union, dedicated to European public procurement. It is the official entry point to all business opportunities involving public procurement contracts for values above EU thresholds (EUR 144 000) in the European Union, the European Economic Area and beyond.
 the Publications Office online public access catalogue (OPAC), allowing librarians or other information professionals, to search in more than 330 000 individual bibliographic records and download metadata of their selected publications into their own catalogues.
 The EU Web Archive preserves websites of EU institutions, agencies and bodies. It maintains collections using the Archive-It service:

Management Committee 
The Publications Office of the European Union is managed by its Director-General and Senior Management on the basis of the strategic guidelines set by the Management Committee.

See also 

 Official Journal of the European Union
 EUR-Lex
 data.europa.eu
 EuroVoc
 CORDIS (Community Research & Development Information Service)

References

General Services in the European Commission
Web archiving initiatives